KORA-FM (98.3 MHz) is a long-running radio station in Bryan, Texas currently owned by Brazos Valley Communications, LLC.  Its format is Country, with emphasis on Texas artists and groups. Its Program Director is Rob Edwards.  The station's studios and transmitter are located in Bryan.

Personalities include: The Roger 'WWW' Garrett Morning Show, Brandie Alexander middays, Rob Edwards in the Afternoon, Andrew Grimm in the Evening' and Texas Nation with Dr. Ron.

External links

ORA
Bryan, Texas